The following is a list of Mamluk sultans. The Mamluk Sultanate was founded in 1250 by mamluks of the Ayyubid sultan as-Salih Ayyub and it succeeded the Ayyubid state. It was based in Cairo and for much of its history, the territory of the sultanate spanned Egypt, Syria and parts of Anatolia, Upper Mesopotamia and the Hejaz. The sultanate ended with the advent of the Ottoman Empire in 1517.

There were a total of 47 sultans, although Sultan an-Nasir Muhammad reigned three times and sultans an-Nasir Hasan, Salah ad-Din Hajji, Barquq and an-Nasir Faraj each reigned twice. The Mamluk period is generally divided into two periods, the Bahri and Burji periods. The Bahri sultans were predominantly of Turkic origins, while the Burji sultans were predominantly ethnic Circassians. While the first three Mamluk sultans, Aybak, his son al-Mansur Ali, and Qutuz, are generally considered part of the Bahri dynasty, they were not part of the Bahriyya mamluk regiment and opposed the political interests of the Bahriyya. The first sultan to come from the Bahriyya's ranks was Baybars. The Burji mamluks usurped the throne in 1382 with the accession of Sultan Barquq. The 34th sultan, al-Musta'in Billah, was also the Mamluk Abbasid caliph and was installed in power by the Burji emirs as a figurehead.

List of sultans

References

Bibliography

Mamluk

Mamluk Sultans